Lambwe derives its name from Lambwe Valley Settlement Scheme is an area (class L - Area) in Homa Bay County found in the former Nyanza Province, Kenya (Africa) with the region font code of Africa/Middle East. It is located at an elevation of 1,107 meters above sea level.

Homa Bay County